Hagelstein can refer to:

a person's surname:
 Peter L. Hagelstein, a MIT professor
 Hans Hagelstein, a Dutch businessman
 Jacob Ernst Thomann von Hagelstein, a German Baroque painter

a building:
 Hagelstein Commercial Building, a Historic Place in the National Register of Historic Places listings in Tom Green County, Texas

German-language surnames